Raninder Singh (born 2 August 1967) is an Indian politician from Punjab, India, and son of the former Chief Minister of Punjab Amarinder Singh. He is the titular heir to the Phulkian royal dynasty of Patiala.

Early life and education
He belongs to royal house of Patiala belonging to the Phulkian dynasty, and son of Amarinder Singh and Preneet Kaur. He has a sister Jai Inder Kaur. He attended Yadavindra Public School, Patiala and subsequently studied at The Doon School, Dehradun. Thereafter he graduated from St. Stephen's College, Delhi and afterward completed a master of business administration degree from Buckingham University, UK in 1990.

Career
He started his political career in late 1990s, by assisting during the election campaigns of his father and mother Preneet Kaur, an Indian National Congress MP from the Patiala Lok Sabha constituency, three times, 1999, 2004 and 2009.

Subsequently joined the Youth Congress division of party himself. In 2005, he was appointed General Secretary of the Punjab Pradesh Congress Committee(PCC) in 2005 and made in-charge of the Bathinda district. In the coming years, he worked in the region, and as a result he was credited for Congress winning the maximum seats in the Malwa region, in the State Assembly elections in India, 2007, while the party faced a rout in Majha and Doaba regions of Punjab.

He unsuccessfully contested Lok Sabha elections against Harsimrat Kaur Badal, the wife of Punjab Deputy Chief Minister Sukhbir Singh Badal in 2009 general elections, from Bathinda, in a high-profile run up to the elections.

He lost 2012 Punjab Assembly elections in 2012 from Samana constituency.

President of National Rifle Association of India
He was appointed as the President of the National Rifle Association of India (NRAI) in December 2009. He won from his nearest rival Shyam Singh Yadav by a landslide majority. He has been an accomplished international level trap shooter himself.

He was elected as Vice President of International Shooting Sports Federation in November 2018.

Personal life
He married Rishma Kaur (née Dhingra), daughter of Kuldip Singh Dhingra and Meeta Dhingra of Berger Paints India Limited in 1995, and the couple have one son, Yadauinder Singh (b. 2003), and two daughters namely Seherinder Kaur (b.1996) and Inayatinder Kaur (b.1999).

References

 General Election 2009 - Affidavits filed by Ranninder Singh Office of Chief Electoral Officer - Punjab

External links
Genealogy of rulers of Patiala Queensland University

Indian National Congress politicians from Punjab, India
Punjabi people
Indian Sikhs
1967 births
Living people
People from Patiala
The Doon School alumni
Alumni of the University of Buckingham
Indian National Congress politicians
Pretenders